is the main railway station in the city of Obihiro in Hokkaido, Japan. It is located on the Nemuro Main Line and is managed by Hokkaido Railway Company (JR Hokkaido). Originally built in 1905, the station was rebuilt in 1996, but part of the original tracks that ran past the old Obihiro Station can still be seen on the north side of the station.

Lines
Obihiro Station is served by the Nemuro Main Line, and is situated 180.1 km from the starting point of the line at Takikawa Station. The station is numbered "K31".

Limited express services
Obihiro Station is served by the following Limited express services.
 Ōzora (Sapporo - Kushiro)
 Tokachi (Sapporo - Obihiro)

The fastest journey time between Sapporo and Obihiro is approximately 2 hours and 25 minutes by the Ōzora.

Station layout
The station consists of two elevated island platforms serving four tracks.

Facilities
The station has a "Midori no Madoguchi" staffed ticket office and also a Twinkle Plaza travel agency. The Kitaca farecard cannot be used at this station.

History
The station opened on 21 October 1905. With the privatization of JNR on 1 April 1987, the station came under the control of JR Hokkaido.

Adjacent stations

References

External links

 JR Hokkaido station information 

Railway stations in Hokkaido Prefecture
Stations of Hokkaido Railway Company
Railway stations in Japan opened in 1905